, (1722) 1 Strange 505, is a famous English case on personal property law and finder's rights. It is one of the first cases that established possession as a valuable property right and as evidence of ownership. The defendant in the case was Paul de Lamerie, a great producer of silverworks in the 18th century. His name was misspelled by the court reporter.

Facts
Armory was a chimney sweep's boy who found a jewel in the setting of a ring. He took the jewel to the shop of Delamirie, a goldsmith, to obtain a valuation of the item. An apprentice, the agent of Delamirie, surreptitiously removed the gems from the setting on the pretense of weighing it. The apprentice returned with the empty setting and informed Armory that it was worth three halfpence. The apprentice offered to pay him for it but Armory refused and asked the apprentice to return the stones and setting in their prior condition.  The apprentice returned the socket of the jewel without the gems. Armory brought an action against Delamirie in trover (via respondeat superior for the actions of his apprentice).

The issue before the court was whether either party had any property rights to the jewel.

Judgment
The Court held that both Armory and Delamirie had property rights in the jewel, even though neither was the true owner. Sir John Pratt CJ held they each have a right to possession that is enforceable against everyone except those with a greater right to the possession. The true owner of the jewel was not relevant; the Court was only concerned with who had a better right to possession. The priority of rights to possession says that a finder has better title to property that he or she finds over everyone except the true owner, and Armory thus had full title to the jewel. The Court found in favour of Armory. Since the jewel was not produced at the trial, Armory was awarded the maximum value that a jewel of that form could have (under the principle that a wrongdoer should not be able to derive gain, i.e. uncertainty of damages, from the effects of his wrongdoing). and for others in the future.

The report shows the following text:

Literature 
Armory v Delamirie inspired A. M. Watson’s literary fiction novel Infants of the Brush: A Chimney Sweep’s Story, which focuses on the life of the chimney sweep’s boy who found the jewel.

See also
Lost, mislaid, and abandoned property
Trover
Conversion (law)

Notes

External links
 Judgment on BAILII

1722 in England
1722 in British law
English property case law
Court of King's Bench (England) cases